The 2018–19 season saw Barnsley playing in the EFL League One. The season covered the period from 1 July 2018 to 30 June 2019.

On 30 April 2019, it was confirmed that Barnsley F.C was promoted to EFL Championship, will play in
the 2019–20 EFL Championship season.

Squad

Appearances and goals correct as of 16 May 2019.

Statistics

 

|-
!colspan=14|Players on loan:

|-
!colspan=14|Players who left during the season:

|}

Goals record

Disciplinary record

Contracts

Competitions

Pre-season friendlies
Barnsley announced pre-season friendlies against Gainsborough Trinity, York City, Salford City, West Brom Albion and Hull City.

League One

League table

Result summary

Results by matchday

Matches
On 21 June 2018, the EFL League One fixtures for the forthcoming season were announced.

FA Cup

The first round draw was made live on BBC by Dennis Wise and Dion Dublin on 22 October. The draw for the second round was made live on BBC and BT by Mark Schwarzer and Glenn Murray on 12 November. The third round draw was made live on BBC by Ruud Gullit and Paul Ince from Stamford Bridge on 3 December 2018.

EFL Cup

On 15 June 2018, the draw for the first round was made in Vietnam.

EFL Trophy

On 13 July 2018, the initial group stage draw bar the U21 invited clubs was announced. The draw for the second round was made live on Talksport by Leon Britton and Steve Claridge on 16 November.

Transfers

Transfers in

Transfers out

Loans in

Loans out

References

Barnsley F.C. seasons
Barnsley